Flip & Fill are a Manchester, England based electronic dance music duo, consisting of the producers/remixers, DJs Graham Turner and Mark Hall.  They are signed to the All Around The World record label.

Career
Having released tracks since 2000, they reached No. 34 in the UK Singles Chart in March 2001 with "True Love Never Dies", based on a mash-up of "Airwave" by Rank 1 and Donna Williams' "True Love Never Dies", with re-recorded vocals by Kelly Llorenna.  Remixed and re-released, it reached No. 7 in February 2002.

In addition to Llorenna, Karen Parry has also provided vocals for the act, including on their 2002 No. 3 UK hit, "Shooting Star" Jo James is another singer who provided vocals for their releases, "Field of Dreams" and a remix of the Whitney Houston hit "I Wanna Dance With Somebody". They have also produced a remix of Ayumi Hamasaki's song "July 1st" which peaked at No. 3 on Japan's Oricon album chart.

The band recorded a cover version of the Pop! song, "Heaven and Earth", but it was not released as a single.

The band are no longer signed to AATW.

The band have recently set up their own record label "Filtrate".

Discography

Albums
2003 – Floor Fillas – UK No. 29, BPI: Silver

Singles
2001 – "True Love Never Dies" [featuring Kelly Llorenna] – UK No. 34 (2002 remix - No. 7), AUS No. 88, BPI: Silver
2002 – "Shooting Star" [featuring Karen Parry] – UK No. 3, BPI: Silver
2003 – "I Wanna Dance With Somebody" [featuring Jo James] – UK No. 13
2003 – "Shake Ya Shimmy" [vs. Porn Kings] – UK No. 28
2003 – "Field of Dreams" [featuring Jo James] – UK No. 28
2004 – "Irish Blue" [featuring Junior] – UK No. 20
2004 – "Discoland" [featuring Karen Parry] – UK No. 11

Unreleased tracks
1999 – "Memory"
1999 – "Free Your Soul"
2004 – "Pacific Sun (Lullaby)"
2006 – "Six Days (On The Run)"
2006 – "Angel" [featuring Karen Danzig]
2007 – "U R The Best Thing"
2007 – "Heaven & Earth" [featuring Jo James]
2007 – "Single Life"
2008 – "A Girl Like Me" [featuring Lara McAllen]
2008 – "Heartbeat" [featuring Lara McAllen]

Remixes
1999 – Project 3 "All For One"
2000 – DJ Aligator "The Whistle Song"
2001 – Kelly Llorenna "Tell It to My Heart"
2001 – Rozalla "Everybody's Free"
2001 – Milk Inc. "In My Eyes"
2001 – Interactive "Forever Young"
2001 – N-Trance "Set You Free"
2001 – Clubstar "Clubstar"
2001 – S Club 7 "Stronger"
2002 – Ayumi Hamasaki "July 1st"
2002 – Sophie Ellis-Bextor "Music Gets the Best of Me"
2002 – Trinity-X "Forever"
2002 – Aquagen "Hard To Say I'm Sorry"
2002 – Orion Too "Hope And Wait"
2002 – Lasgo "Something"
2002 – Lasgo "Pray"
2002 – DJ Aligator "Lollipop"
2002 – Milk Inc. "Land of the Living"
2002 – Rachel McFarlane – "Lover"
2002 – DJ Sammy & Yanou featuring Do "Heaven"
2002 – Girls Aloud "Sound of the Underground"
2002 – Scooter "Nessaja"
2002 – The Time Frequency "Real Love"
2002 – Soda Club featuring Hannah Alethea "Take My Breath Away"
2002 – Aurora "If You Could Read My Mind"
2002 – Milk Inc. "Walk on Water"
2002 – Aurora "The Day It Rained Forever"
2002 – Apollo "Dance"
2002 – Girls Aloud "I Think We're Alone Now"
2002 – S Club "Alive"
2002 – Paffendorf "Be Cool"
2002 – Angelle "Joy And Pain"
2002 – Porn Kings vs. Flip & Fill "Shake Ya Shimmy"
2001 – Kelly Llorenna "Heart of Gold"
2003 – Alex C. feat. Yasmin K. "Rhythm of the Night"
2003 – Lazard "4 O'Clock (In the Morning)"
2003 – The System presents Kerri B "If You Leave Me Now"
2003 – Miss Peppermint "Welcome To Tomorrow"
2003 – Q-Tex "Power of Love"
2003 – Ultrabeat "Pretty Green Eyes"
2003 – Indien "Show Me Love"
2003 – Rezonance Q "Someday"
2003 – Big Ang featuring Siobhan "It's Over Now"
2003 – XTM presents Annia "Fly on the Wings of Love"
2003 – Tiffany Gayle "Do You Wanna Dance"
2003 – Kaci "I'm Not Anybody's Girl"
2003 – Rachel Stevens "Sweet Dreams My LA Ex"
2004 – Special D. "Come With Me"
2004 – DJ Jose "Hecitate"
2004 – Quango & Zunie featuring Nikki Belle "Music Is My Life"
2004 – Clear Vu "I Adore"
2004 – Laura Branigan "Self Control"
2004 – Scooter "Jigga Jigga!"
2004 – Ashley Jade "Let Me Be Your Fantasy"
2004 – Royal Gigolos "California Dreamin'"
2004 – Girls Aloud "Jump"
2004 – Girls Aloud "The Show"
2004 – Neo Cortex "Elements"
2004 – Styles & Breeze featuring Karen Danzig "Heartbeatz"
2004 – Ultrabeat "Feelin' Fine"
2004 – Ultrabeat "Better Than Life"
2004 – Marly "You Never Know"
2004 – Full Force "Just The Way It Is"
2004 – Awesome 3 Feat Bailey "Don't Go"
2004 – LMC vs. U2 "Take Me to the Clouds Above"
2004 – Open Arms "Hey Mr. DJ"
2004 – Porn Kings vs. Mix Factory "Take Me Away"
2004 – DJ Milano "Sweet Child of Mine"
2004 – Dance Assassins featuring Karen Parry "Here I Am"
2004 – Scott Brown "I Would Stay"
2005 – Special D "Nothing I Won't Do"
2005 – Route-1 featuring Jenny Frost "Crash Landing"
2005 – Access 3 "Promised Land"
2005 – Francesca "You Are The One"
2005 – Northstarz "Baby Baby"
2005 – Escape "What I Gotta Do"
2005 – Escape "Flying Away"
2005 – Groove Coverage "Runaway"
2005 – Ultrabeat "Feel It With Me"
2005 – XTM & DJ Chucky presents Annia "Give Me Your Love"
2005 – Rachel Stevens "I Said Never Again (But Here We Are)"
2005 – Killa Deejayz "Freed From Desire"
2005 – Girls Aloud "Wake Me Up"
2006 – September "Satellites"
2006 – Headhunters featuring Karen Danzig "I've Got A Feeling"
2006 – Nalin & Kane featuring Alex Prince "Cruising"
2006 – Eddie Thoneick & Kurd Maverick "Love Sensation"
2006 – Micky Modelle & Jessy "Over You"
2006 – Lacuna "Celebrate The Summer"
2006 – Helena Paparizou "Mambo"
2006 – Frisco "The Summer Is Magic"
2006 – Scooter "Apache Rocks The Bottom!"
2006 – Tall Paul "Rock Da House"
2006 – Darren Styles "Save Me"
2006 – Ultrasun "We Can Runaway"
2006 – Cascada "Everytime We Touch"
2006 – Starstylers "Keep on Moving"
2006 – D:Code featuring Emma "My Direction"
2006 – Dancing DJs "Right Beside You"
2006 – D:Code featuring Emma "Out of My Hands"
2007 – Oceanic "Insanity"
2007 – Kate Ryan "Voyage Voyage"
2007 – N-Euro "Lover on the Line"
2007 – Delusion featuring Jenna C "Never Gunna Let You Go"
2007 – Alex C. Feat. Yasmin K. – "Sweetest Ass in the World"
2007 – Cascada "What Do You Want From Me?"
2007 – Velvet "Fix Me"
2007 – Sublime "The Rain"
2007 – Liz Kay "When Love Becomes A Lie"
2007 – Kelly Llorenna "I Will Love Again"
2007 – FHM High Street Honeys "I Touch Myself"
2007 – M&C featuring Rebecca Rudd "Magic Touch"
2007 – Paradise "See The Light"
2007 – Ultrabeat vs. Darren Styles "Sure Feels Good"
2007 – Inaya Day "U Spin Me"
2007 – Cascada "What Hurts the Most"
2007 – Shanie "Don't Give Me Your Life"
2007 – Dame Shirley Bassey "Get The Party Started"
2007 – Killa Deejayz "Around The World (La La La La La)"
2007 – Audiolush "Feel The Power"
2007 – Melanie Flash "Halfway To Heaven"
2007 – Micky Modelle vs. Jessy "Show Me Heaven"
2007 – Work-A-Holics "9 To 5"
2007 – Frisco "Sea of Love"
2007 – Hixxy "More & More"
2007 – Girls Aloud "Sexy! No No No"
2007 – Scooter "The Question What Is The Question?"
2007 – Dancing DJs featuring Caroline Griffin "Amazed"
2008 – Scooter "I'm Lonely"
2008 – Manian "Hold Me Tonight"
2008 – Dee Grees vs. The Real Booty Babes "Apologize"
2008 – Micky Modelle vs. Samantha Mumba "Gotta Tell Ya"
2008 – Micky Modelle "Take Me Away"
2008 – Girls Aloud "Something Kinda Ooooh"
2008 – Bimbo Jones "Come And Fly With Me"
2008 – Eyeopener "Singin' Dam Di Da Doo"
2009 – N-Force "All My Life"
2009 – Captain Jack "Dream A Dream"
2009 – Yanou "Brighter Day"
2009 – Stunt "Fade Like The Sun"
2009 – Angelic "It's My Turn"
2009 – Girls Aloud "The Promise"
2009 – Digital Rush "I'm on My Way"
2009 – D:Code "Who Are You"
2009 – Lockout featuring Chenai "Bounce"
2009 – Friday Night Posse featuring Caroline Griffin "Before He Cheats"
2010 – Manian "Ravers in the UK"
2010 – Manian "Loco"
2010 – Dan Balan "Chica Bomb"
2010 – Ultrabeat "Bring It Back"
2010 – DJ Roxx "The Weekend Has Come"
2011 – Azuro featuring Elly "Ti Amo"

References

External links
 Flip & Fill at Discogs

Musical groups from Manchester
English electronic music duos
Electronic dance music duos
British trance music groups
Male musical duos
Remixers
All Around the World Productions artists